Al Madina School of Richmond is a private school in Chesterfield County, Virginia, established in 1998. It is the only Islamic school in the Richmond area.

The school offers Montessori for Pre-K, a standard curriculum through the twelfth grade, Qur'anic studies, Arabic as a foreign language, and Islamic studies. It offers an associate degree in a dual degree program.

References

Schools in Chesterfield County, Virginia
Islamic schools in the United States